A New Day Yesterday may refer to:

 A New Day Yesterday (video album), a video album by Jethro Tull
"A New Day Yesterday", a 1969 song by Jethro Tull from the album Stand Up
 A New Day Yesterday (Joe Bonamassa album)